Ponthieva maculata, the spotted ponthieva, is a species of orchid found from Venezuela, Colombia, Costa Rica and Ecuador.

References

maculata
Orchids of South America
Orchids of Costa Rica
Plants described in 1845